Shambala or Shambaa is a Bantu language of Tanzania.

Overview
Shambala, also Kishambala, (ki)Sambaa, (ki)Shambaa is spoken by the Shambaa in the Usambara mountains in the Lushoto District and Muheza District, Tanga Region, of northern Tanzania. Some dialectal variation exists between the language as spoken in the area around Lushoto and the areas around Mlalo and Mtae, possibly also between the Shambaa of the Western Usambara Mountains and the Eastern Usambara Mountains.

Phonology

Vowels 
Five vowels are noted as [i, ɛ, a, ɔ, u].

Consonants 

The diacritics within prenasal voiceless plosives are devoiced as [ᵐ̥ ⁿ̥ ᵑ̊].

References

External links
 Shambaa Information

Languages of Tanzania
Northeast Coast Bantu languages